Claude Izner is the pseudonym of Liliane Korb (born in 1940) and Laurence Lefèvre (born in 1951) who write the "Victor Legris"  crime novels. Legris is a bookseller in late 19th-century Paris who is also an amateur detective. The books were originally bestsellers in France, and are now published in the UK by Gallic Books.

Bibliography
 Mystère rue des Saints-Pères (Murder on the Eiffel Tower) (2003)
 La Disparue du Père-Lachaise (The Père-Lachaise Mystery) (2003)
 Le Carrefour des Écrasés (The Montmartre Investigation) (2003)
 Le Secret des Enfants-Rouges (The Marais Assassin) (2004)
 Le Léopard des Batignolles (The Predator of Batignolles, published in the United States as In the Shadows of Paris) (2005)
 Le Talisman de la Villette (Strangled in Paris) (2006)
 Rendez-vous passage d'Enfer (2008)
 La Momie de la Butte-aux-Cailles (2009)
 Le Petit Homme de l'Opéra (2010)
 Les Souliers bruns du quai Voltaire (2011)
 Minuit, impasse du Cadran (2012)
 Le Dragon du Trocadéro (2014)

References

External links
 Profile at Gallic Books.

Living people
Collective pseudonyms
Year of birth missing (living people)
Pseudonymous women writers
21st-century French novelists
21st-century pseudonymous writers